Mike Knox is a Houston politician who serves on the Houston City Council representing At-Large Position 1.

Personal life
Knox was born in Houston, Texas. He has been married to his high school sweetheart, Helen Knox, since 1977. Together, they have one son. His son is now a police officer in Houston. Knox has an associate art degree from Houston Community College, and a Bachelor of Science from the University of Houston-Downtown. He obtained his degrees while working as a Houston Police officer. He is a veteran of the United States Air Force and served 15 years on the Houston Police force. In 1995, he published Gangsta in the House; Understanding Gang Culture which is a book that focuses on gang culture, and the National Gang Research Center recognized it in 2001 with the honorable “Thrasher” award.

Political career
Knox is a Republican. He was first elected to represent At-large Position 1 of the Houston City Council on November 15, 2014, and assumed office on January 2, 2016. 

In 2016, Knox fired a staffer who attempted to block a Muslim from being appointed to Harris Republican Party precinct chair.

References

21st-century American politicians
21st-century American writers
Texas Republicans
Houston City Council members
Year of birth missing (living people)
Living people